Bahia Honda or Bahía Honda (meaning "Deep Bay" in Spanish) may refer to:

Bahia Honda Key in the U.S. state of Florida
Bahía Honda, Cuba, in the province of Artemisa
Bahía Honda (Colombia), a bay in La Guajira, Colombia
Honda Bay, Philippines, a bay in Palawan, Philippines
Bahía Honda, Los Santos, a corregimiento in Panama
Bahía Honda, Veraguas, a corregimiento in Panama